Legacy of Steel may refer to

 Legacy of Steel, a 1998 fantasy novel by Mary H. Herbert
 Legacy of Steel, an EverQuest guild